"Fire" is a song from Lacuna Coil's sixth studio album Dark Adrenaline.

Critical reception
"Fire" was met with generally mixed reviews and was met with criticism due to its pop tones. Rockstar Weekly stated that "Fire" it's "more radio friendly than anything". Loud Wire said that "has a hip-shaking drum beat has a tinge of a dancy feel without losing its edginess. Scabbia sings the very appealing chorus “Let the fire enter / Let the anger start to brew / Let your instincts break the rules / Let it rise and consume / Give into yourself.” Its poetic rhythm and upbeat drum pattern makes the song that more enjoyable".

Music video

The music video for "Fire" was filmed on 10 May 2012 and directed by Brendan Kyle Cochrane. The video was shot in Brooklyn's The Red Hook Grain Terminal at the same place where Martin Scorsese filmed a scene for The Departed.

According to the Italian magazine Panorama, the music video for "Fire", directed by Brendan Kyle Cochrane, will never be released. A frame from the music video, showing Cristina Scabbia, appeared on the official website of the production company of the video.

 Director: Brendan Kyle Cochrane
 Director of photography: Bruce Cole
 Editor: Jonathan Rouzier
 Production company: NYLAHD

An editor's cut version of the video was leaked on Vimeo on 29 September 2013.

A 2016 interview with Scabbia revealed that the band had opposed releasing the video due to concerns they were showing visual signs of fatigue after four months of touring, but relented after the video had leaked.

Track listing
Digital Download
 "Fire" - 2:55
 "Dark Adrenaline" - 3:19

Chart performance

Release history

References

2012 singles
Lacuna Coil songs
EMI Records singles
2011 songs
Century Media Records singles
Songs written by Andrea Ferro
Songs written by Cristina Scabbia
Songs written by Don Gilmore (record producer)